In Bangladesh, the Bangladesh Road Transport Authority (BRTA) issues vehicle registration plates for motor vehicles. The vehicle registration plates in Bangladesh use the Bengali alphabet and Bengali numerals. The current version of vehicle registration plates started in 1973. The international vehicle registration code for Bangladesh is BD.

The general format of vehicle registration plates in Bangladesh is "city - vehicle class letter and number - vehicle number". For example, : "DHAKA-D-11-9999""111"
. The "DHAKA" field represents the city name in Bengali letters, the "D" field represents the vehicle class in Bengali letters, the "11" field represents the vehicle class in Bengali numerals and the "9999" field represents the vehicle number of the vehicle in Bengali numerals.

The plates are installed in both the front and rear of the vehicle, with the rear plate permanently attached to the vehicle. The plate is only removed when the vehicle has reached the end of service and has been sold for scrap. New vehicles are not delivered to the purchaser until the plates have been attached at the dealership.

Appearance

The letters permitted in the vehicle registration plate are:

The numerals permitted in the vehicle registration plate are:

Transportation offices and markings

Vehicle class letter numbers
 White  = Private service vehicle  Green  = Public service vehicle

25-4268

External links

Road transport in Bangladesh
Bangladesh
Bangladesh transport-related lists